The Old Lodore School, which has also been known as the Lodore School, in Brown's Park, Colorado, was built in 1911.  It was listed on the National Register of Historic Places in 1975.

It served ranch children in the area of Brown's Hole, "long the famed hide-out for Butch Cassidy and other outlaws of similar status", from 1911 to 1947.  The Brown's Park Women's Club took control of the building in 1954 for it to be used as a community center.  In 1970 it came under control of the Colorado Fish and Wildlife Resources Development Services, but continued in use as a community center.

It is located by the Green River on State Highway 318.

It has a cupola-style bell tower, hiding a brick chimney behind it. It was built by carpenters Evers, Hunt & Hoover.

According to the NRHP nomination, about spelling:The spelling of Lodore or Lodore has resulted from the different references made by local newspapers. The
correct spelling is Lodore as given to it by John Wesley Powell in remembrance of the poem "The Gates of Lodore". Newspapers have so long misspelled the name that some still misspell it as Ladore.

References

Schools in Colorado
National Register of Historic Places in Moffat County, Colorado
School buildings completed in 1911
School buildings on the National Register of Historic Places in Colorado